The Parti Québécois leadership election of 1985 was held to elect a new leader of the Parti Québécois, the main sovereigntist and social democratic political party in Quebec, Canada. It elected Pierre-Marc Johnson at the helm of the party. It was conducted under the one member, one vote universal suffrage system, making the Parti Québécois the first political party to do so in Quebec history. It was the first race of its kind in the history of the party, created in 1968, and would be followed by the leadership election of 2005.

History 
The election was caused by the departure of founder René Lévesque, and was conducted while the party was in power. With Pierre-Marc Johnson elected, he would assume premiership from October to December 1985. Johnson afterwards played the role of Leader of the Opposition until 1987.

The election finds its historical importance in the fact that, in the first era of said "Post-Referendum Syndrome", the election of Pierre-Marc Johnson secured the party's past decision of putting the independence project, the first raison d'être of the PQ, on the back burner. This decision had caused a crisis within party ranks, which was influential in the departure of René Lévesque. This party stance of affirmation nationale (Johnson's approach of nationalism without actively pursuing the objective of sovereignty) would last until the ousting of Johnson and the arrival of Jacques Parizeau as leader in 1988.

It was the first attempt of Pauline Marois for the leadership, one that she would repeat at the leadership election of 2005. Bernard Landry, future leader from 2001 to 2005, also entered the race of 1985, only to drop out midway. During his campaign, Landry had presented himself as a "sovereigntist and progressive" candidate and, during his campaign, given signs that, if elected leader, he could rescind the party decision of putting sovereignty on hold. Guy Bertrand's campaign tended to represent the sovereigntist pur et dur stream of the party, clashing with his later ideological shift.

Candidates 
Guy Bertrand
Luc Gagnon
Jean Garon
Pierre-Marc Johnson
Francine Lalonde
Bernard Landry (withdrew)
Pauline Marois

Results

See also 
2005 Parti Québécois leadership election
2007 Parti Québécois leadership election
History of Quebec
Politics of Quebec
Quebec sovereignty movement

References 
Petite leçon d'histoire from Le Devoir
Élection de Pierre Marc Johnson on the Bilan du siècle website of the Université de Sherbrooke

External links
Official Parti Québécois website

1985 elections in Canada
1985
Parti Québécois leadership election